Fox 28 may refer to one of the following television stations in the United States affiliated with the Fox Broadcasting Company:

Current
KAYU-TV in Spokane, Washington
KBVU in Eureka, California
KFXA in Cedar Rapids, Iowa
KGAN-DT2, a digital channel of KGAN in Cedar Rapids, Iowa (branded as Fox 28)
WNYF-CD in Watertown, New York
WPGX in Panama City, Florida
WSYX-DT3, a digital channel of WSYX in Columbus, Ohio (branded as Fox 28)
WTGS in Hardeeville, South Carolina

Former
KFXA in Cedar Rapids, Iowa (1988 to 1994 and 1995 to 2021)
KYLE-TV in Bryan/College Station, Texas (1994 to 2015)
WFTS-TV in Tampa/St. Petersburg, Florida (1988 to 1994)
WSJV in Elkhart/South Bend, Indiana (1995 to 2016)
WTTE in Columbus, Ohio (1986 to 2021)